Gitana 13 is an ocean-racing catamaran. She has had several names, including:
2000: Innovation Explorer, skippered by Loïck Peyron. She was built for The Race, a no-limits nonstop crewed circumnavigation in which she took second place.
2002: Orange, won the Jules Verne Trophy with skipper Bruno Peyron in 2002
2003: Kingfisher 2, skippered by Ellen MacArthur. She broke her mast in 2003, south-east Kerguelen Islands, whilst competing for Jules Verne Trophy.
2006: Gitana 13 with skipper Lionel Lemonchois
2010–2012: Swift

She is the sister ship of Club Med, winner of The Race with skipper Grant Dalton in 2000.

Records
As Orange, she won the Jules Verne Trophy (Around the world sailing record) in 64 days, 8 hours, 37 minutes and 24 seconds, in 2002.
As Gitana 13, she set the transpacific record between San Francisco and Yokohama in 43 days, 3 minutes and 18 seconds, in 2008.
Record from New York to San Francisco via Cape Horn, 2008 Feb, 43d 3m 18s

References

Individual catamarans
Individual sailing vessels
2000s sailing yachts
Sailing yachts designed by Gilles Ollier
Sailing yachts built in France
The Race yachts